Gemmula osca is an extinct species of sea snail, a marine gastropod mollusk in the family Turridae, the turrids.

Description

Distribution
Fossils of this marine species have been found in Spain.

References

 Pacaud J.M. (2021). Remarques taxonomiques et nomenclaturales sur les mollusques gastéropodes du Paléogène de France et description d'espèces nouvelles. Partie 3. Conoidea. Xenophora Taxonomy. 31: 41–48.

osca
Gastropods described in 2021
Fossil taxa described in 2021